is a Japanese anime film and two-chapter manga created by Syun Matsuena. The CGI film was screened at the Shogakukan's Jisedai World Hobby Fair '11 Summer in July 2011, while the manga was published in Shogakukan's shōnen manga magazine Weekly Shōnen Sunday in September 2011.

Characters

Media

Film
Created, designed, written and produced by Matsuena himself, with music composed by Tenmon, the Waza no Tabibito CGI film was screened at the Shogakukan's  '11 Summer on July 2, 2011. The film was released on DVD, along with the collected tankōbon volume of the manga and a soundtrack CD, on November 18, 2011.

Manga
Written and illustrated by Syun Matsuena, the two chapters of Waza no Tabibito were published in Shogakukan's shōnen manga magazine Weekly Shōnen Sunday from September 21–28, 2011. Shogakukan collected these chapters in a single tankōbon volume, released on November 18, 2011.

See also
Kenichi: The Mightiest Disciple, another manga series by the same author
Kimi wa 008, another manga series by the same author
Tokiwa Kitareri!!, another manga series by the same author

References

Further reading

External links
 

2011 anime films
Action anime and manga
High fantasy anime and manga
Shogakukan manga
Shōnen manga